The Buștenari-Runcu oil field is an oil field located in Buștenari, Prahova County. It was discovered in 1989 and developed by Petrom. It began production in 1995 and produces oil.

References

Oil fields in Romania